is a railway station in the city of Mutsu, Aomori Prefecture, Japan, operated by East Japan Railway Company (JR East).

Lines
Akagawa Station is served by the Ōminato Line, and is located 53.2 kilometers from the terminus of the line at Noheji Station.

Station layout
The station has one ground-level side platform serving single  bidirectional track. The station is unmanned, and has no station building, but only a simple rain shelter on the platform.

History
It was renamed Akagawa Station on December 1, 1941. All freight operations were discontinued as of March 15, 1972, after which time the station was unattended. With the privatization of Japanese National Railways on April 1, 1987, it came under the operational control of JR East.

Surrounding area

Mutsu Bay

See also
 List of railway stations in Japan

External links

  

Railway stations in Aomori Prefecture
Ōminato Line
Railway stations in Japan opened in 1921
Mutsu, Aomori